Ezra John Royals (born January 1882) was an English footballer. His regular position was as a goalkeeper. He was born in Fenton, Staffordshire. He played for Chesterton White Star, Northwich Victoria, and Manchester United.

External links
profile

1882 births
English footballers
Manchester United F.C. players
Northwich Victoria F.C. players
Year of death missing
Association football goalkeepers